The sushi burrito or sushirrito is a type of Japanese-American fusion cuisine. It is typically prepared by rolling sushi ingredients such as fish and vegetables in a wrap and serving like a burrito. The dish is a form of American cuisine inspired by Japanese cuisine, but is not considered to be authentically Japanese.

Variations 
Some variations of the sushi burrito include Mexican American ingredients typical of burritos, while others are simply burrito-sized rolls with traditional ingredients. The latter dish was described by GQ as an "oversized maki roll." Sushi burrito recipes often include raw or fried fish, as well as seaweed or rice wrappers in place of traditional tortillas used in burritos. Soy paper is also commonly used as a wrap.

History 
The sushi burrito was created in 2008 by Peter Yen of the San Francisco fast casual restaurant Sushirrito. Since then, the dish has expanded in popularity and is sold by a variety of sushi and burrito restaurants in the United States.

Reception 
Sushi burritos have seen widespread popularity in the United States since their creation. Their popularity is partly based on the popularity of both sushi and burritos as take-out and casual dining meals, as well as the influence of "foodie" culture. Josh Scherer of the Los Angeles Times described the popularity of the sushi burrito as a food trend, and criticized both the eating experience and authenticity of the dish.

See also
 Sinaloan sushi
 Sushi pizza

References 

American fusion cuisine
Sushi in the United States
Tortilla-based dishes
Mexican-American cuisine